Dominican Republic participated in the 2010 Summer Youth Olympics in Singapore.

Medalists

Athletics

Boys
Track and Road Events

Girls
Track and Road Events

Sailing

One Person Dinghy

Weightlifting

Wrestling

Freestyle

References

External links
Competitors List: Dominican Republic

2010 in Dominican Republic sport
Nations at the 2010 Summer Youth Olympics
Dominican Republic at the Youth Olympics